Derrick "Smoke" Gainer (born August 22, 1972) is an American former professional boxer who competed from 1990 to 2012. He held the WBA featherweight title from 2000 to 2003.

Professional career
In 2000, Gainer defeated Freddie Norwood to win the WBA featherweight title and after four defenses lost to Juan Manuel Márquez, who became super champion, via technical decision in 2003. Since his defeat to Marquez, Gainer lost in a challenge to WBA titleholder Chris John via unanimous decision. Gainer is also a colleague and good friend of fellow Pensacola, Florida native Roy Jones Jr., and often fought on his under-cards.

His last was a split decision win over Carlos Navarro on the undercard of the Roy Jones-Anthony Hanshaw bout at the Mississippi Coast Coliseum, in Biloxi, Mississippi.

Derrick started a charter high school for at risk kids in 1999 which he named after his late grandmother Dr. Ruby J Gainer. This year Gainer started Fit Nation which is a childhood obesity program with goals to help kids make healthy life style changes.

References

External links
 
Interview with Fightnews
DiBella Entertainment article
Profile
Scandinavian site

|-

1972 births
Boxers from Florida
Featherweight boxers
Living people
Sportspeople from Pensacola, Florida
American male boxers
African-American boxers
World Boxing Association champions
World featherweight boxing champions
20th-century African-American sportspeople